Phalanthum or Phalanthon, also known as Phalanthus or Phalanthos (Φάλανθος), was a town of ancient Arcadia, in the district Orchomenia, near Methydrium, situated upon a mountain of the same name. Its site is unlocated.

References

Populated places in ancient Arcadia
Former populated places in Greece
Lost ancient cities and towns